Cieszowa  (German Czieschowa) is a village in the administrative district of Gmina Koszęcin, within Lubliniec County, Silesian Voivodeship, in southern Poland.

The village has a population of 288.

References

External links 
 Jewish Community in Cieszowa on Virtual Shtetl

Cieszowa